The Order of Glory ( or ) was a Tunisian honorary order founded in 1835 by Al-Mustafa ibn Mahmud the Bey of Tunisia. The order was awarded until the constitutional role of the Bey was abolished following 1957.

Background information
The order essentially existed in two different models: the first awarded from its creation in 1835 and the second following 1859. Initially awarded in a single class, the order was reorganized and awarded in five classes following 1843 and expanded to six classes in 1882:

  Grand Cordon
  Grand-officer
  Commander
  Officer
  Knight of 1st class
  Knight of 2nd class

This order could be awarded to people of French nationality, cities (like Verdun), and other notable foreigners with some connection to Tunisia. It was given by the bey of Tunis on a proposal from the chief vizier for Tunisian subjects and, in all the other cases, on a proposal from the resident general of France (which occupies de facto the post of Foreign Minister of Tunisia). Although the resident general has a quota, this last remains about it always the large Master. Each bey having put his monogram on the center of the decoration, it is possible to determine the approximate award date of each order.

Examples of the decoration
The typical decoration is manufactured from solid silver with green and red enameled rays for some classes. The reverse of the decoration as well as the bow and suspension ring may have jeweler, date, and acceptance markings. These particular decorations (second model) were awarded by Ali Muddat ibn al-Husayn Bey (1882–1902).

These particular decorations were awarded by Muhammad III as-Sadiq Bey (1859–1882) and illustrate the differences that can exist between French and local Tunisian manufactured decorations:

Text of the diploma
Awardees were given a diploma which in general had the following text (translated):

Praises with God alone! On behalf of the Servant of God glorifié, of that which puts as a God his confidence and the care of its destinies leaves him, [name of the bey], Possesseur of the Kingdom of Tunis with [name of the decorated person] on the proposal of Our Foreign Minister, which made known to us your noble qualities, We conferred this decoration to you. Our name is engraved there and it is [number of the class] class of Our Kind of Nichan Iftikhar. Carry it with joy and happiness! Writing it [date of decoration].

These two diplomas awarded to the same person in 1927, commander class, illustrate the order's typical diplomas:

Notable recipients
 Abdessalem ben Mohamed GOAIED El Ferchichi El Aloui El Mohammedi (1877-1919) Leader & Caid of the Fraichiche tribe, Thala, Tunisia, Knight of the Order of Glory, Tunisia, 1901, Knight of the National Order of the Legion of Honor, France, 1907, Knight of the Order of Glory, Tunisia, 1910
 J.M. Abdul Aziz, Business Leader Saigon, Recipient Légion d'honneur, French Silver Red Cross
 Archduke Wilhelm of Austria, colonel in Ukrainian People's Army
 Tomáš Garrigue Masaryk, President of Czechoslovakia, awarded in 1922
 Paul Boyer, French photographer
 Augusto Carlos Teixeira de Aragão, Portuguese army general, doctor, numismatist, archaeologist, historian.
 Albert Besson, doctor, hygienist and bacteriologist French
 Pierre Billotte, general and politician French
 Andrew Cunningham, 1st Viscount Cunningham of Hyndhope, British admiral
 Gustave Daladier, French flying ace and professional soldier
 A. Peter Dewey, American army officer
 Louis Dewis, Belgian / French post-impressionist painter
 Émile-Joseph Duzer, French colonel (Commander)
 Theodore Roosevelt Jr., brigadier general
 Dwight David Eisenhower, general and American president
 Louis Leon César Faidherbe, French soldier and colonial administrator
 Célestin Hennion, French army officer and prefect of police
 Henri Gadeau de Kerville, French scientist
 Benjamin Jaurès, French naval officer
 Louis Loyzeau de Grandmaison, French general
 Antonia Mercé, Spanish dancer resident in France; recipient in 1933
 Pierre Messmer, French politician
 Louis McClellan Potter, American sculptor
 Bernard Saint-Hillier, French general
 Philippe Thomas (1843–1910), amateur geologist who discovered deposits of phosphates in Tunisia.
 Pakubuwana X
 Petrus I Regout (1801-1878), Dutch industrialist
 Alexander Schaepkens (1815-1899), Dutch pictorial artist

References

External links
Tunisian Nishan Iftikhar on Medals of the World
Ottoman Order of Glory on Medals of the World

Awards established in 1835
Awards disestablished in 1957
Orders, decorations, and medals of Tunisia